Verdun is a small settlement in the foothills of the Gorjanci range southeast of Novo Mesto in southeastern Slovenia. The area is part of the traditional region of Lower Carniola and is now included in the Southeast Slovenia Statistical Region.

Name
Verdun was attested in written sources in 1367 as Wardaun (and as Werdin in 1477, Burdin in 1490, and Verdum in 1494). The name Verdun is derived from the Romance word *(g)uardōne(m), based on the Germanic word *wardō 'guard'. Although this place name can be understood in a military sense, it is likely that it referred instead to a place where herdsmen guarded their animals.

Cultural heritage
A burial ground with 254 graves has been excavated near the settlement. It dates to the early Roman period and artefacts show the increased influence of Roman culture on the local population.

References

External links
Verdun on Geopedia

Populated places in the City Municipality of Novo Mesto